Epideira schoutanica is a species of sea snail, a marine gastropod mollusk in the family Horaiclavidae.

Distribution
This marine species is endemic to Australia and occurs off South Australia, Tasmania and Victoria.

References

Further reading
 May, W.L. 1910. New marine Mollusca. Proceedings of the Royal Society of Tasmania 48: 380–398
 Hedley, C. 1922. A revision of the Australian Turridae. Records of the Australian Museum 13(6): 213–359, pls 42–56
 May, W.L. 1923. An Illustrated Index of Tasmanian Shells: with 47 plates and 1052 species. Hobart : Government Printer 100 pp.
 Wilson, B. 1994. Australian Marine Shells. Prosobranch Gastropods. Kallaroo, WA : Odyssey Publishing Vol. 2 370 pp.
 Simon J. Grove, 2006 A Systematic List of the Marine Molluscs of Tasmania, Queen Victoria Museum and Art Gallery.

External links
  Tucker, J.K. 2004 Catalog of recent and fossil turrids (Mollusca: Gastropoda). Zootaxa 682:1–1295

schoutanica
Gastropods of Australia
Gastropods described in 1911